Helberg is a surname. Notable people with the surname include:

Claus Helberg (1919–2003), Norwegian resistance fighter and mountain guide
Robert J. Helberg (1906–1967), American aeronautical engineer
Sandy Helberg (born 1949), German American actor
Simon Helberg (born 1980), American actor and comedian

See also 
 Helberg (crater), lunar crater just behind the western limb of the Moon on the far side from the Earth
 Hellberg
 Hillberg